Birinci Yüzbaşılı is a village in the Agdam District of Azerbaijan.  The village forms part of the municipality of Xındırıstan.

References 

Populated places in Aghdam District